The Trumpchi GS4 is a compact crossover SUV of the late-2010s produced by GAC Group under the Trumpchi brand in China and the GAC Motor brand globally. 

The first generation was launched in 2015, and was available as a gasoline variant, a plug-in hybrid electric variant and a pure electric variant. The plug-in hybrid electric variant was sold by the GAC Mitsubishi joint venture under the Eupheme brand as the Eupheme PHEV, and by GAC Honda joint venture under the GAC Honda brand as the Shirui PHEV. Both variants feature restyled front and rear end designs while still wears the GAC badge. The pure electric version was rebadged by the GAC Toyota joint venture under the Leahead brand as the Leahead ix4. 

The second generation was launched in 2019, and was offered as a regular crossover SUV bodystyle and a fastback crossover SUV called the GS4 Coupe.

First generation (A28/A32)

The first generation Trumpchi GS4 debuted as a pre-production concept on the 2015 North American International Auto Show. This final production version debuted on the 2015 Auto Shanghai and was later launched in the Chinese auto market. Codename A28. The GS4 is based on the same platform as the GA3S sedan and is positioned between the GS3 and GS5 crossovers. Pricing ranges from around 80,000 yuan to around 120,000 yuan ($13,000 – 19,360).
The GS4 was on display along with the rest of the Trumpchi lineup at the 2017 Detroit Auto Show, with GAC Group claiming it would cost less than the Toyota RAV4 if it were to be sold in North America.

Trumpchi GS4 EV
The Trumpchi GS4 EV is a new electric vehicle debuted on the 2015 Guangzhou Auto Show and based on the Trumpchi GS4 crossover. It was launched on the Chinese car market during the second half of 2016. The GS4 EV is powered by an electric motor producing 140hp and 250nm and is capable of a range of 240 kilometer. The top speed of the GS4 EV is 120 kilometer per hour and 0-100 km/hr acceleration is under 11 seconds. Charging takes 12 hours for a full charge on 220V or 30 minutes for a 80% battery on a fast charger. The GS4 EV model is also sold by Toyota under the Leahead brand as the "Leahead ix4".

Trumpchi GS4 PHEV
The Trumpchi GS4 PHEV is the plug-in hybrid version of the GS4 crossover. The GS4 PHEV is powered by a 1.5 liter engine and the G-MCelectric system with the engine producing a maximum power of 71kW（97hp）and 120 N·m and the electric motor producing 177hp（130kW）and 300N·m, capable of a range of over 600km and a pure electric range of 58km. Fuel economy is 1.6 L/km. The GS4 PHEV also features a rotating gear selector. The model range received a facelift in September 2018 for the 2019 model year. The GS4's PHEV model is also sold by Mitsubishi under the Eupheme brand as simply the "Eupheme PHEV". Another variant is rebadged and sold as the GAC Honda Shirui PHEV by the GAC Honda joint venture.

Facelift
GAC launched the GS4 facelift version in June 2018, codename A32, compared to the pre-facelift version, the facelift version sports restyled bumpers, a set of redesigned rims in the same style as the GS3, and a new dashboard. Two months later, GAC launched the "Millionth Edition", the Millionth Edition GS4 features a panoramic sunroof and LED headlights.

In July 2019, the updated GS4 fitting the new Chinese emission standard was launched, the updated version only uses a new turbocharged direct injection engine called 4A15J1 (169 hp, 265Nm) mated to a 6 speed manual gearbox or 6 speed automatic gearbox (Aisin AWF6F25).

Second generation (A39)

The second generation Trumpchi GS4 debuted in September 2019. The production model was available to the Chinese market in November 2019, with the power coming from a 1.5 liter turbo engine producing 169hp and 265N·m. The transmission is a third generation 6-speed automatic transmission supplied by Aisin.

Trumpchi GS4 II PHEV
The plug-in hybrid version of the second generation GS4, the GS4 II PHEV was launched in April 2020. It is powered by a 1.5T liter turbo engine producing 150hp and 220N·m with the electric motor adding an additional 177hp. The battery capacity is 13kWh and is supplier by CATL. The pure electric range is 61km rated by NEDC.

Trumpchi GS4 Coupe
A fastback version of the second generation GS4 model called the Trumpchi GS4 Coupe was launched with GS4 second generation. It uses the same engine as the regular GS4 but transmission is replaced by a 7-speed Wet dual clutch transmission called 7WDCT.

Trumpchi GS4 Plus
The 2021 facelift of the second generation Trumpchi GS5 was renamed to Trumpchi GS4 Plus. The Trumpchi GS4 Plus features completely redesigned front and rear ends and restyled 19-inch alloys, while the interior still heavily resembles the interior of the second generation GS5.

See also
 List of GAC vehicles

References

External links

 
 (Global)

Compact sport utility vehicles
Front-wheel-drive vehicles
2010s cars
Cars introduced in 2015
Cars of China
GS4
Production electric cars
Plug-in hybrid vehicles